The 2023 Nepal Tri-Nation Series can refer to:

 2023 Nepal Tri-Nation Series (round 19), a cricket tri-series in February 2023 between Namibia, Nepal and Scotland
 2023 Nepal Tri-Nation Series (round 21), a cricket tri-series in March 2023 between Nepal, Papua New Guinea and the United Arab Emirates